Claude Edorh (born 27 February 1972) is a retired German hurdler.

He won the bronze medal at the 1991 European Junior Championships and finished fourth at the 1994 European Championships, the latter in a career best time of 13.41 seconds. This places him ninth (joint with Dietmar Koszewski) on the German all-time list, behind Florian Schwarthoff, Mike Fenner, Eric Kaiser, Falk Balzer, Thomas Blaschek, Sven Göhler, Thomas Munkelt and Holger Pohland. Edorh represented the sports club ASV Köln.

References

1972 births
Living people
German male hurdlers
Athletes (track and field) at the 1996 Summer Olympics
Olympic athletes of Germany
ASV Köln athletes